William Cooke or Bill Cooke may refer to:

Sports
Harry Cooke (born William Henry Cooke, 1919–1992), English footballer
William Cooke (cricketer) (1868–1954), New Zealand cricketer
William Cooke (footballer) (1915–?), English footballer
 Bill Cooke (defensive end) (born 1951), American football defensive end
 Bill Cooke (footballer) (1888–1950), Australian rules footballer

Politicians
William Cooke (died 1558), MP for New Woodstock and Portsmouth
William Cooke (died 1589), MP for Stamford and Grantham
 Sir William Cooke (of Highnam) (1572–1619), English Member of Parliament
William Cooke (died 1703) (1620–1703), MP for Gloucester
William Cooke (1682–1709), MP for Gloucester
 William Mordecai Cooke Sr. (1823–1863), Confederate politician
William Cooke, MP for Lewes
 William Wilcox Cooke (died 1816), Associate Justice of the Tennessee Supreme Court

Others
 William Fothergill Cooke (1806–1879), English inventor
 William Ernest Cooke (1863–1947), Australian astronomer
 William Cooke (Methodist) (1806–1884), Methodist New Connexion 
 William Cooke (Provost of King's College) (1711–1797), academic and Church of England priest
 William Cooke (priest, born 1821) (1821–1894), Church of England priest and hymn-writer
 William Bernard Cooke (1778–1855), English line engraver
 William Bridge Cooke (1908–1991), American mycologist
 William Gordon Cooke (1803–1847), New Orleans druggist and major in the Texian Army
 Andrew Crooke and William Cooke, English publishers (William Cooke died c. 1641)
 Sir William Bryan Cooke, 8th Baronet (1782–1851), of the Cooke baronets
 Sir William Ridley Charles Cooke, 9th Baronet (1827–1894), of the Cooke baronets
 Sir William Henry Charles Wemyss Cooke, 10th Baronet (1872–1964), of the Cooke baronets
 William W. Cooke (1846–1876), US officer killed at the Battle of Little Bighorn
 William Wilson Cooke (1871–1949), American architect
 3894 Williamcooke, asteroid named for William Ernest Cooke

See also
William Cook (disambiguation)